Udvalgene vedrørende Videnskabelig Uredelighed
UltraViolet (system)